Byron Gustavo Andrés Vásquez Maragaño also known as Byron  Vásquez (born 16 May 2000) is a Chilean footballer who plays as a forward for Tokyo Verdy.

Career
Vásquez started his youth career with Aomori Yamada High School from 2016 to 2018. Vásquez started his first career with Iwaki FC in 2019 after graduation from high school in two years, but returned in 2021 after loan to chilean club.

In 2020, Vasquez loan to chilean club, Universidad Catolica but he left the club after a season at Chile.

On 5 December 2021, he brought his club promotion to the J3 League as well as JFL champions for the first time in their respective history. 24 days later at same month and year, Vasquez signed to J2 club, Tokyo Verdy from Iwaki FC for upcoming 2022 season.

Personal life
Vásquez was born in Chile but moved to Japan since his youth. On 16 May 2022, He announced his intention to acquire Japanese nationality on SNS.

He obtained Japanenese citizenship through naturalization in October 2022, although there are a few interviews that needs to be done before he had it.

Both of his parents are foreigners, but he is fluent in Japanese and can read and write perfectly.

Career statistics

Club
.

Notes

Honours
Iwaki
Japanese Regional Football Champions League : 2019
Japan Football League : 2021

References

2000 births
Living people
Chilean footballers
Association football forwards
Japan Football League players
J2 League players
Iwaki FC players
Club Deportivo Universidad Católica footballers
Tokyo Verdy players
Chilean expatriate footballers
Chilean expatriate sportspeople in Japan
Expatriate footballers in Japan
People from Santiago Province, Chile